Mateo Andačić (born 16 November 1997) is a Croatian footballer. He plays as a midfielder for Chemie Leipzig in the German Regionalliga Nordost.

References

1997 births
Living people
Footballers from Frankfurt
Association football midfielders
Croatian footballers
Croatia youth international footballers
FSV Frankfurt players
FSV Wacker 90 Nordhausen players
NK Rudeš players
Kickers Offenbach players
BSG Chemie Leipzig (1997) players
3. Liga players
First Football League (Croatia) players
Regionalliga players
Croatian expatriate footballers
Expatriate footballers in Germany
Croatian expatriate sportspeople in Germany